Ramakrishna Beeranna Naik (15 November 1904 – 26 November 1970) was an Indian Politician who served as the chairman (Head of the Upper house)  of the Karnataka Legislative Council Vidhan Parishad (1968 acting and 1970) of the Governmennt of Karnataka, Bangalore.

R. B. Naik was born in Hiregutti village and completed his B.A. from the Wilson College, Mumbai and then his L.L.B. from the Government Law College, Mumbai. He was a lawyer by profession, a social worker and a politician by necessity. 
Naik was an active member of the Congress Party. As a Member of the Legislative Assembly, he was in Y B Chavan's government of the Bombay State. 
Naik died on job in 1970 and was laid to rest with State honors; the funeral services for Naik were held in Gokarna one of the holy cities of Hindus.

References

External links 
 R. B. Naik bioprofile on kla.kar.nic.in

1904 births
1970 deaths
People from Uttara Kannada
Kannada people
Members of the Karnataka Legislative Council
Chairs of the Karnataka Legislative Council
University of Mumbai alumni
Indian National Congress politicians from Karnataka